Khalas are a Palestinian Israeli-Arab Oriental metal band, formed in 1999. The name of the band means "enough" in Arabic.

In 2013, the band embarked on a tour across Europe along with Israeli band Orphaned Land, an event which brought coverage to the band in Western media, in outlets such as The Guardian and CNN.

Arabic Language
In the Arabic language, 'Khalas' is also a frequently used term to say 'It's enough'. It is many a times, used to put a stop to a discussion as 'Khalas now'.

Discography

 Ma Adesh Feeha (We've Had It) (2003) 
 Arabic Rock Orchestra (2013) 
 The Peace Series Vol. 1 (2021)  -- Split EP with Orphaned Land

References

External links
 Khalas - Official website (No Longer Available)

Oriental metal musical groups
Musical groups established in 1999
Musical quartets
Palestinian artists
Israeli Arab artists
1999 establishments in Israel
Israeli heavy metal musical groups
Palestinian musical groups